Cladonia atlantica, also known as the Atlantic cup lichen, is a species of lichen in the family Cladoniaceae. It is found among the Atlantic Coast of the US, ranging from South Carolina to the Northeastern United States.

Taxonomy

Name 
The species name atlantica originates from the Atlantic Ocean, which is most likely due to the fact the species is found on the Atlantic Coast of the United States.

Subspecies 
C. atlantica has 5 subspecies.

 Cladonia atlantica f. atlantica
 Cladonia atlantica f. microphylla A.Evans
 Cladonia atlantica f. ramosa A.Evans
 Cladonia atlantica f. ramosissima A.Evans
 Cladonia atlantica f. subsimplex A.Evans

References 

atlantica